By Love Possessed is a 1961 American drama film distributed by United Artists. The movie was directed by John Sturges, and written by Charles Schnee, based on the novel by James Gould Cozzens.

Lana Turner, Efrem Zimbalist Jr., Jason Robards Jr., George Hamilton and Susan Kohner head the cast. Hamilton called it "an Ivy League Peyton Place". The supporting cast features Thomas Mitchell, Barbara Bel Geddes, Everett Sloane, Carroll O'Connor, and Jean Willes.

The theme song is performed by Vic Damone. This was director Sturges' first film project after his Western classic, The Magnificent Seven.

On July 19, 1961, this became the first in-flight movie to be shown on a regular basis on a scheduled airline flight, by Trans World Airlines to its first-class passengers.

Plot

In a Massachusetts law firm, Arthur Winner, Julius Penrose and Noah Tuttle are equal partners. Each has an ongoing problem in his personal life.

Clarissa, married to Arthur, feels unloved. Marjorie feels unsatisfied because her husband, Julius, has been crippled and depressed since a car crash and believes his wife no longer finds him desirable. This leads to a romantic affair between Marjorie and Arthur.

Warren Winner, irresponsible son of Arthur, is expected to marry Noah's wealthy ward, Helen Detweiler, but he is not in love with her. Warren instead loses himself in a fling with a prostitute, Veronica Kovacs, who angrily reacts to his ending their relationship by accusing him of rape. Warren flees rather than face the charges in court. Helen is so distraught, she commits suicide.

The firm has represented Helen's financial affairs, but when Arthur looks into it, he discovers that Noah has embezzled $60,000 from Helen's account (although for a worthy cause: to keep the town's struggling streetcar operation afloat). One by one, everyone is confronted about owing up to their responsibilities, beginning with Warren, who on Marjorie's advice turns himself in to the law to fight the accusations against him.

Cast

Lana Turner as  Marjorie Penrose
Efrem Zimbalist Jr. as  Arthur Winner
Jason Robards Jr. as  Julius Penrose
George Hamilton as  Warren Winner
Susan Kohner as  Helen Detweiler
Thomas Mitchell as  Noah Tuttle
Barbara Bel Geddes as  Clarissa Winner
Everett Sloane as  Dr. Reggie Shaw
Yvonne Craig as  Veronica Kovacs
Gilbert Green as  Mr. Woolf
Frank Maxwell as  Jerry Brophy
Carroll O'Connor as  Bernie Breck
Jean Willes as  Junie McCarthy

See also
 List of American films of 1961

References

External links

1961 films
1961 romantic drama films
American romantic drama films
1960s English-language films
Films about adultery in the United States
Films scored by Elmer Bernstein
Films based on American novels
Films directed by John Sturges
Films produced by Walter Mirisch
Films set in Massachusetts
United Artists films
1960s American films